The Jodel D.150 Mascaret is a French two-seat single-engined light aircraft of the 1960s built by Société Aéronautique Normande (SAN) as a replacement for the earlier Jodel D11 trainer/tourer aircraft.

Development and design
In 1961, Jean Délémontez designed a two-seat light aircraft for the Société Aeronautique Normande (SAN) at Bernay in Normandy to replace his earlier Jodel D.11, which SAN (amongst other manufacturers) were building to meet a requirement for aircraft to equip flying clubs subsidised by the French government. Délémontez based the new design on his three–four seat Jodel Ambassadeur, (also being built by SAN), with a reduced span wing and shorter fuselage.

The new aircraft, the D.150 Mascaret - named after a tidal bore first flew on 2 June 1962, production beginning in 1963.

Like all the light aircraft that Délémontez designed under the Jodel and Robin names, the D.150 is a low-winged monoplane of wooden construction, with distinctive upturned outer wings. The D.150 was the first Jodel fitted with an all-moving tail, later fitted on larger models such as DR.1051 model (Sicile Record). It has a fixed tailwheel undercarriage, with its crew of two sitting side by side under a two-door canopy.  It was offered with the same range of engines as the larger Ambassadeur, giving a good performance for a two-seat trainer/tourer.

Operational history

Sixty-one D.150s had been completed by 1969, when SAN went into liquidation, the factory being brought by Avions Mudry. Plans for homebuilt construction of the Mascaret remain available, over 100 having been built, including completion of an unfinished factory airframe.

Variants
D.150 Mascaret
Basic version, powered by 75 kW (100 hp) Rolls-Royce Continental O-200 engine, 39 factory built.
D.150A Mascaret
Version powered by 78 kW (105 hp) Potez 4E engine, 22 factory built.

Specifications (D.150 100 hp Continental)

Notes

References

 Gunston, Bill. World Encyclopedia of Aircraft Manufacturers. Stroud, UK: Sutton Publishing, Second edition, 2005. .
 Harrison, Neil. "In The Air:No. 188: Jodel D.150 Mascaret". Flight International, 13 August 1964, pp. 260–262.
 Taylor, John W. R. Jane's All The World's Aircraft 1965-66. London: Samson Low, Marston, 1965.
 Taylor, Michael J.H. Brassey's World Aircraft & Systems Directory 1999/2000. London: Brassey's, 1999. . 

1960s French civil utility aircraft
Mascaret
Single-engined tractor aircraft
Low-wing aircraft
Jodel aircraft
Aircraft first flown in 1962